Great Bite is a value-priced product line of breath mints and fruit-flavored hard candies. The product line has shark-themed branding, including the appearance of shark bite marks on the packaging and labels. The candies are manufactured in China. In 2011, exclusive rights to distribute the Great Bite line of mints and candies were sold to Ferrara Pan Candy Company.

See also
 List of breath mints
 List of confectionery brands

References

American confectionery
Brand name confectionery
Candy
Breath mints